Kabul Polytechnic University is the main center of educating engineers in Kabul, Afghanistan. It was founded on 13 October 1963 (1342 mizan in the Afghan calendar) as Kabul Polytechnic Institute and is located in 72 hectares of land in Karte Mamourin, North-Western Kabul. In the opening ceremony government officials from both Afghanistan and other countries were present. Since its establishment it has been considered one of the important entities in providing education and training.

This University has 3 faculties and 20 departments (courses) that include 12 professional and 8 general subjected departments.

The university building includes classrooms, laboratory, library, dormitory, place for professors, cafeteria with 1000 capacity, mosque with 500 capacity, sport facility, conference room with 1000 capacities, workshop and leisure center.

The university building materials were given by the Soviet Union as gift to Afghanistan. Engineers from Soviet Union and Afghanistan worked jointly. After completion of teaching classrooms and laboratory in 1967 (1346), the university began to offer educational service and in the year of 1972 (1351) for the first time students from this university graduated.

Until 1980 (1359) students studied till bachelor level and till 1992 (1371) students could study master level in the field of engineering. In this period people were educated to PhD level.

Upon reopening in 2002, it was renamed Kabul Polytechnic University.

This University is the second largest university in Kabul after Kabul University, Afghanistan. Its staff is dedicated to educate the best young professionals in Afghanistan in the area of Engineering and Computer Sciences. 

This University is the basic center of training for professional engineering cadres in Afghanistan that has trained thousands of specialists in professions of construction of Civil and Industrial buildings, Hydro technical buildings, Road construction, Architecture, Geology and mining, Geology and exploration of mines, Geology and exploration of petroleum and gas, Chemical technology, Engineering geodesy, Automobile and tractor, Power electric supply for industrial institutions cities and villages in B.Sc., M.Sc and P.H.D degrees.

Partnership 
The Civil Engineering Department in UNO is run by the University of Nebraska-Lincoln (UNL) faculty, which provides bachelor’s, master’s and doctorate degrees in Civil Engineering including Water Resources and Hydraulic Engineering.

Funds for this partnership are provided by the United States Agency for International Development (USAID) through FHI360. This partnership is part of the United States Workforce Development Program (USWDP) for Afghanistan administered by FHI360.

The project is designed to develop professional capacity in Afghanistan that addresses the needs of the growing Afghan HHS market. Addressing these needs will require updated methods of education to develop new skills.

The goals 

 Policy Document Development
 Curriculum Development
 Teaching and Learning Material Development Training
 Faculty Training
 Learning Assessment Training
 International Accreditation
 Research Capacity Development
 Admission Policy Strengthening

Objectives for the project 

 To develop new curriculum and develop quality teaching and learning materials relevant to the market-oriented knowledge and employability.
 To develop the teaching skills of KPU faculty in quality teaching.
Expected results of the program include having faculty with enhanced teaching capability and faculty prepared for master graduate advisors in KPU. Ultimately students at KPU will be better prepared to enter the growing HHS sector in Afghanistan.

UNO and UNL faculty will benefit from their exposure to Afghan faculty who will provide unique strengths and life experiences. Shared dialogue and cultural exchange will enhance the sustained relationship among UNO, UNL and KPU and advance mutual understanding among the citizens of the US and Afghanistan.

Faculties
 Construction engineering
 Geology & Mines
 Electromechanics
 Computer science
 Water Resource & Environmental Engineering
 Transportation Engineering
 Chemical Technology
 Geomatics & Cadastral
 Community college

Notable alumni
Mohammad Daoud
Mohammad Alim Qarar
Muhammad Harif Sarwari
Muhammad Hashim Ortaq
Abdul Rahim
Muhammad Yunus Nawandish
Gulbuddin Hikmatyar

See also 
List of universities in Afghanistan

Notes

Universities in Afghanistan
Polytechnic
Educational institutions established in 1963
1963 establishments in Afghanistan